Nazimabad is a suburb of Karachi, Pakistan. It was established in 1952, and is named after the second Governor General of Pakistan Khawaja Nazimuddin.

History
Before the independence of Pakistan, the area of the present day Nazimabad was semi-arid land with small Sindhi and Balochi villages nearly 10 KM from downtown Karachi. The Government of Pakistan bought the land in 1950 from the local landlord and tribal leader Masti Brohi Khan in order to resettle the Muslim refugees that were living in tent cities in central Karachi. Nazimabad was planned and developed starting in 1952 and the land was sold at reduced prices to the refugees. This suburb was named after Khawaja Nazimuddin who was the second Governor-General of Pakistan, and later the second Prime Minister as well.
 
In late 1958, the northern area of Nazimabad, was to be developed as Timuria by Karachi Improvement Trust (KIT). The name North Nazimabad became popular and was later adopted instead of Timuria. North Nazimabad was developed as a residential area for federal government employees. But in the early 1960s, the capital of Pakistan was transferred from Karachi to newly developed capital Islamabad.

In the 1950s, Nazimabad was developed in the outskirts of Karachi and now it is in the central part of the city because of the urban sprawl. Nazimabad was considered an upper-middle-class neighborhood in the 1960-1970s and later it became middle class area as many upper middle class residents moved to the newer developed upscale suburbs and exurbs of Karachi. Starting in late 1950s, the overwhelming majority of Karachi's intellectuals lived in Nazimabad as it was one of the posh neighborhood of Karachi. Starting in the 1990s, Nazimabad was considered to be a lower-middle class residential neighborhood. The old houses are being demolished and in its place new Apartment, Flat and Commercial buildings are being constructed.

Plan
Nazimabad is divided into five residential blocks, Block I to V and commercial from VI to VII. The Block I-V are residential areas with family dwellings. The Block IV of Nazimabad has the largest category of plots with size ranging from 240 to 2000 sq. yards.

Municipal devolution
After devolution plan for municipalities was implemented in 2001, Karachi Division was divided into 18 towns. A large part of Nazimabad was made part of the Liaquatabad Town. While North Nazimabad was named as one of the towns of Karachi. Block I, II, III, IV, VI and VII were made part of Liaquatabad Town while block V and locality of Paposh Nagar was made part of North Nazimabad Town.

Media
Nazimabad is referenced in the popular drama serials Zindagi Gulzar Hai and Maat on Hum TV. These series were telecast in Pakistan in 2013 and in 2015 on Zindagi. In the Zindagi Gulzar Hai drama serial, Nazimabad is portrayed as a Middle Class area of Karachi.

Demography
The population of Nazimabad is estimated to be over million people. Nazimabad is predominantly Urdu speaking suburb. The ethnic groups in Nazimabad include: Muhajirs, Memons, Bohris,  Punjabis, Pakhtuns, Sindhis, Kashmiris, Seraikis, Balochs, etc. Over 98 percent of the population is Muslim with small Christian minority.

See also
 Mujahid Colony
 Goal Market
 North Nazimabad
 Liaquatabad Town
 Naya Nazimabad

References

Neighbourhoods of Karachi
Liaquatabad Town